The 18th Annual GMA Dove Awards were held on 1987 recognizing accomplishments of musicians for the year 1986. The show was held in Nashville, Tennessee.

Award recipients
Song of the Year
"How Excellent Is Thy Name"; Dick and Melodie Tunney, Paul Smith; Word Music, Marquis III; Laurel Press, Pamela Kay Music (ASCAP)
Songwriter of the Year
Dick & Melodie Tunney
Male Vocalist of the Year
Steve Green
Female Vocalist of the Year
Sandi Patti
Group of the Year
First Call
Artist of the Year
Sandi Patti
New Artist of the Year (originally named Horizon Award)
First Call
Southern Gospel Album of the Year
The Master Builder; The Cathedrals; Bill Gaither, Gary McSpadden; RiverSong
Inspirational Album of the Year
Morning Like This; Sandi Patty; Greg Nelson, Sandi Patty; Word Records
Pop/Contemporary Album of the Year
The Big Picture; Michael W. Smith; Michael W. Smith, John Potoker; Reunion Records
Contemporary Gospel Album of the Year
Heart & Soul; The Clark Sisters; Norbert Putnam, Twinkie Clark; Rejoice
Traditional Gospel Album of the Year
Christmasing; Shirley Caesar; Norbert Putnam; Rejoice
Instrumental Album of the Year
Instrument Of Praise; Phil Driscoll; Lari Goss, Phil Driscoll, Ken Pennel; Benson
Praise and Worship Album of the Year
Hymns; 2nd Chapter of Acts; Buck Herring; Live Oak
Children's Music Album of the Year
God Likes Kids; Joel and Labreeska Hemphill; Benson
Musical Album of the Year
A Mighty Fortress;  Steve Green, Dwight Liles, Niles Borop; Sparrow
Short Form Music Video of the Year
"Famine In Their Land"; The Nelons;  Robert Deaton, George Flanigen, directors; Word
Long Form Music Video of the Year
Limelight; Steve Taylor; John Anneman, Steve Taylor, directors; Sparrow
Recorded Music Packaging of the Year
Mark Tucker, Buddy Jackson Don't Wait for the Movie; Whiteheart

References

External links
 https://doveawards.com/awards/past-winners/

GMA Dove Awards
1987 music awards
1987 in American music
1987 in Tennessee
GMA